Shalnagar Union is an Union Parishad under Lohagara Upazila of Narail District in the division of Khulna, Bangladesh.

References

Unions of Lohagara Upazila, Narail
Unions of Narail District
Unions of Khulna Division